ISSO or Isso may refer to:

Places
Italy
 Isso, Lombardy, a comune in the Province of Bergamo

Other uses
 ISSO (Swaminarayan), an organisation under the Swaminarayan Sampraday
 Information Systems Security Officer, see chief information security officer (CISO)
 Current (designated 'I' in electronic engineering) involved the Simultaneous Switching Output (SSO) of Input/output Buffer Information Specification semiconductor simulation models.